Eupithecia sellimima is a moth in the family Geometridae. It is found in Mexico.

References

Moths described in 1927
sellimima
Moths of Central America